Park Gate is a locality in the Borough of Fareham in Hampshire, England. It merges into Locks Heath to the south, Segensworth to the east and Sarisbury to the west.  Within the area are numerous shops, predominantly fast food outlets and estate agents, all centered around Middle Road. Park Gate has two churches (Duncan Road Church and St Margaret Mary R.C), a primary school, two petrol filling stations on Bridge Road, and an unstaffed police station which is closed to the public,. Park Gate has three Public Houses. These are The Talisman, a reference to the Talisman strawberry which was grown locally,  The Village Inn and The Gate, the latter being a new craft beer establishment that opened in 2020. The area is located to the south of Swanwick railway station. Park Gate is home to one Primary School, located in Northmore Road and is in the catchment of Brookfield School, a secondary modern school located about a mile away.

Currently, Park Gate and the surrounding vicinity are subject to large swathes of housing development and as such the village now has the unenvious record of being home to an above average number of estate agents, which form the majority of retail fronts. At the last count (May 2022), Park Gate has eleven estate agents, mainly small independents, distributed from Bridge Road, through Middle Road and onto Botley Road. Park Gate is also not short of fast food outlets, with a number now available in Middle Road, from Indian cuisine to kebabs and pizza.

History
Park Gate was developed around the railway station (called Swanwick), which was a distribution hub for local strawberries that were grown in the area. In 1913, at the peak of strawberry production, more than 3,000 tons of strawberries were sent from local fields every week to be distributed from the station. Strawberry distribution stopped in 1966, however, the railway station remains, and even though fruit and vegetables are still grown in the area, the present landscape is dominated by housing. The Station Master's House adjacent to the railway station has since become a restaurant. 

In 1944, Park Gate played host to convoys of Canadian soldiers and tanks who were stationed along Botley Road adjacent to Fair View Terrace, waiting for their orders for the Normandy D-Day landings. During this time, there was an account of a V1 rocket landing in the Duncan Road area, causing some of the Canadian ammunition trucks to catch fire and explode. 

In the late 1980's, Park Gate along with neighbouring Locks Heath, became a growth sector for Southern Hampshire with modern businesses moving to nearby Segensworth. With Junction 9 of the M27 within easy reach, Park Gate has become a base for commuting East to Portsmouth, West to Southampton and North to Winchester, Andover and Basingstoke. 

One of the oldest surviving buildings at over 125 years old in Park Gate, is the former Thresher's wine store originally called "Swanwick House", located at the junction of Botley Road, Bridge Road and Hunts Pond Road. Originally a beer and wine store, today the building has been largely abandoned and is in a serious state of disrepair, and is subject to legal action against the owner by the local authority.

Gallery

See also
List of places of worship in the Borough of Fareham

Notes

External links
Fareham Council Park Gate page
Fareham Council Ward map

Villages in Hampshire